Janáček is a crater on Mercury. It has a diameter of 47 kilometers. Its name was adopted by the International Astronomical Union (IAU) in 1985. Janáček is named for the Czech composer Leoš Janáček, who lived from 1854 to 1928.
The MESSENGER Mercury orbiter crashed near the crater on 30 April 2015.

References

External links
 

Impact craters on Mercury